SBV Vitesse in European football includes the games which are played by SBV Vitesse in competitions organised by UEFA.

Totals

Top scorers

Competitions by Countries 
{| class="wikitable sortable" style="text-align: center"
 !  
 ! Country
 ! Games
 ! Won
 ! Draw
 ! Lost
 ! Goals Scored
 ! Goals Against
 ! Opponents
 |-
 | rowspan="3"|1
 | align=left| England
 | 8
 | 1
 | 1
 | 6
 | 3
 | 13
 | align=left|Liverpool F.C., Norwich City F.C., Southampton F.C., Tottenham Hotspur F.C.
 |-
 | align=left| France
 | 8
 | 1
 | 2
 | 5
 | 8
 | 16
 | align=left|Bordeaux, RC Lens, OGC Nice, Stade Rennais F.C.
 |-
 | align=left| Italy
 | 8
 | 1
 | 4
 | 3
 | 6
 | 9
 | align=left|Inter Milan, S.S. Lazio, Parma, A.S. Roma
 |-
 | rowspan="4"|4
 | align=left| Belgium
 | 6
 | 3
 | 2
 | 1
 | 8
 | 7
 | align=left|R.S.C. Anderlecht, KV Mechelen, S.V. Zulte Waregem
 |-
 | align=left| Ireland
 | 6
 | 4
 | 2
 | -
 | 10
 | 4
 | align=left|Derry City F.C.(2), Dundalk FC
 |-
 | align=left| Portugal
 | 6
 | 2
 | 1
 | 3
 | 5
 | 8
 | align=left|S.C. Beira-Mar, S.C. Braga, Sporting CP
 |-
 | align=left| Romania
 | 6
 | 2
 | 3
 | 1
 | 9
 | 7
 | align=left|FC Petrolul Ploiești, FC Rapid București, FC Viitorul Constanța
 |-
 | rowspan="10"|8
 | align=left| Austria
 | 2
 | 1
 | -
 | 1
 | 3
 | 2
 | align=left|SK Rapid Wien
 |-
 | align=left| Bulgaria
 | 2
 | 1
 | -
 | 1
 | 7
 | 5
 | align=left|PFC Lokomotiv Plovdiv
 |-
 | align=left| Germany
 | 2
 | 1
 | 1
 | -
 | 5
 | 4
 | align=left|SV Werder Bremen
 |-
 | align=left| Greece
 | 2
 | 1
 | 1
 | -
 | 6
 | 3
 | align=left|AEK Athens F.C.
 |-
 | align=left| Israel
 | 2
 | 1
 | ' | 1 | 4 | 2 | align=left|Maccabi Haifa F.C.
 |-
 | align=left| Russia | 2 | - | - | 2 | - | 4 | align=left|FC Anzhi Makhachkala
 |-
 | align=left| Scotland | 2 | 2 | - | - | 5 | 0 | align=left|Dundee United F.C.
 |- 
 | align=left| Slovenia | 2 | 2 | - | - | 5 | 1 | align=left|NŠ Mura
 |-
 | align=left| Spain | 2 | - | - | 2 | - | 2 | align=left|Real Madrid CF
 |-
 | align=left| Switzerland | 2 | - | - | 2 | 0 | 2'''
 | align=left|FC Basel
|}

 Most Played Team 

Results

(1990–2000)

1990-91 seasonVitesse won 1–0 on aggregate.Vitesse won 5–0 on aggregate.Sporting CP won 4–1 on aggregate.1992-93 seasonVitesse won 5–1 on aggregate.Vitesse won 2-0 on aggregate.Real Madrid won 2–0 on aggregate.1993-94 seasonNorwich City won 3–0 on aggregate.1994-95 seasonParma won 2–1 on aggregate.1997-98 seasonBraga won 3–2 on aggregate.1998-99 seasonVitesse won 6–3 on aggregate.Bordeaux won 3–1 on aggregate.1999-2000 seasonVitesse won 2–0 on aggregate.Lens won 5–2 on aggregate.(2001–2010)

2000-01 seasonVitesse won 4–2 on aggregate.1–1 on aggregate. Inter win on away goals2002-03 seasonVitesse won 2–1 on aggregate.Vitesse won 5–4 on aggregate.Liverpool won 2–0 on aggregate.(2011–2020)

2012-13 seasonVitesse won 7–5 on aggregate.Anzhi Makhachkala won 4–0 on aggregate.2013-14 seasonFC Petrolul Ploiești won 3–2 on aggregate.2015-16 seasonSouthampton won 5–0 on aggregate.2017-18 season

2018-19 seasonVitesse won 5–3 on aggregate.Basel won 2–0 on aggregate.(2021–2030)

2021-22 seasonVitesse won 4–3 on aggregate.Vitesse won 5–4 on aggregate.Vitesse won 3–2 on aggregate.Roma won 2–1 on aggregate.''

Notes

References

Dutch football clubs in international competitions
SBV Vitesse

External links
 FC Twente in Europa League
 Official web site of SBV Vitesse